Turano may refer to:

Places
 , a village and subdivision of the  Valvestino, in Brescia, Italy
 Lago del Turano, a lake in the Province of Rieti, Lazio, Italy
 , a river which passes through Rieti, Italy where it was dammed to form the Lago del Turano

People
 John Turano, American alt-right activist
 Renato Turano (1942-2021), Italian-American politician and businessman

See also
 Turano-Mongolian cattle, a group of taurine cattle in Northern and Eastern Asia